Yitang Zhang (born February 5, 1955) is a Chinese-American mathematician primarily working on number theory and a professor of mathematics at the University of California, Santa Barbara since 2015.

Previously working at the University of New Hampshire as a lecturer, Zhang submitted a paper to the Annals of Mathematics in 2013 which established the first finite bound on the least gap between consecutive primes that is attained infinitely often. This work led to a 2013 Ostrowski Prize, a 2014 Cole Prize, a 2014 Rolf Schock Prize, and a 2014 MacArthur Fellowship. Zhang became a professor of mathematics at the University of California, Santa Barbara in fall 2015.

Early life and education 
Zhang was born in Shanghai, China, with his ancestral home in Pinghu, Zhejiang. He lived in Shanghai with his grandmother until he went to Peking University. At around the age of nine, he found a proof of the Pythagorean theorem. He first learned about Fermat's Last Theorem and the Goldbach conjecture when he was 10. During the Cultural Revolution, he and his mother were sent to the countryside to work in the fields. He worked as a laborer for 10 years and was unable to attend high school. After the Cultural Revolution ended, Zhang entered Peking University in 1978 as an undergraduate student and received a bachelor of science in mathematics in 1982. He became a graduate student of Professor Pan Chengbiao, a number theorist at Peking University, and obtained a master of science in mathematics in 1984.

After receiving his master's degree in mathematics, with recommendations from Professor Ding Shisun, the President of Peking University, and Professor Deng Donggao, Chair of the university's Math Department, Zhang was granted a full scholarship at Purdue University. Zhang arrived at Purdue in January 1985, studied there for six and a half years, and obtained his PhD in mathematics in December 1991.

Career 
Zhang's PhD work was on the Jacobian conjecture. After graduation, Zhang had trouble finding an academic position. In a 2013 interview with Nautilus magazine, Zhang said he did not get a job after graduation. "During that period it was difficult to find a job in academics. That was a job market problem. Also, my advisor [Tzuong-Tsieng Moh] did not write me letters of recommendation." Zhang made this claim again in George Csicsery's documentary film "Counting from Infinity: Yitang Zhang and the Twin Prime Conjecture" while discussing his difficulties at Purdue and in the years that followed. Moh claimed that Zhang never came back to him requesting recommendation letters. In a detailed profile published in The New Yorker magazine in February 2015, Alec Wilkinson wrote Zhang "parted unhappily" with Moh, and that Zhang "left Purdue without Moh's support, and, having published no papers, was unable to find an academic job". In 2018, responding to reports of his treatment of Zhang, Moh posted an update on his website. Moh wrote that Zhang "failed miserably" in proving the Jacobian conjecture, "never published any paper on algebraic geometry" after leaving Purdue, and "wasted seven years of his own life and my time". 

After some years, Zhang managed to find a position as a lecturer at the University of New Hampshire, where he was hired by Kenneth Appel in 1999. Prior to getting back to academia, he worked for several years as an accountant and a delivery worker for a New York City restaurant. He also worked in a motel in Kentucky and in a Subway sandwich shop. A profile published in the Quanta Magazine reports that Zhang used to live in his car during the initial job-hunting days. He served as lecturer at UNH from 1999 until around January 2014, when UNH appointed him to a full professorship as a result of his breakthrough on prime numbers. Zhang stayed for a semester at The Institute For Advanced Study in Princeton, NJ in 2014, and he joined the University of California, Santa Barbara in fall 2015.

Research 

On April 17, 2013, Zhang announced a proof that there are infinitely many pairs of prime numbers that differ by less than 70 million. This result implies the existence of an infinitely repeatable prime 2-tuple, thus establishing a theorem akin to the twin prime conjecture. Zhang's paper was accepted by Annals of Mathematics in early May 2013, his first publication since his last paper in 2001. The proof was refereed by leading experts in analytic number theory. Zhang's result set off a flurry of activity in the field, such as the Polymath8 project.

If P(N) stands for the proposition that there is an infinitude of pairs of prime numbers (not necessarily consecutive primes) that differ by exactly N, then Zhang's result is equivalent to the statement that there exists at least one even integer k < 70,000,000 such that P(k) is true. The classical form of the twin prime conjecture is equivalent to P(2); and in fact it has been conjectured that P(k) holds for all even integers k. While these stronger conjectures remain unproven, a result due to James Maynard in November 2013, employing a different technique, showed that P(k) holds for some k ≤ 600. Subsequently, in April 2014, the Polymath project 8 lowered the bound to k ≤ 246. With current methods k ≤ 6 is the best attainable, and in fact k ≤ 12 and k ≤ 6 follow using current methods if the Elliott–Halberstam conjecture and its generalization, respectively, hold.

Honors and awards 
Zhang was awarded the 2013 Morningside Special Achievement Award in Mathematics, the 2013 Ostrowski Prize, the 2014 Frank Nelson Cole Prize in Number Theory, and the 2014 Rolf Schock Prize in Mathematics.

He is a recipient of the 2014 MacArthur award, and was elected as an Academia Sinica Fellow during the same year. He was an invited speaker at the 2014 International Congress of Mathematicians.

Political views 
In 1989 Zhang joined a group interested in Chinese democracy. In a 2013 interview, he affirmed that his political views on the subject had not changed since.

Publications

References

External links 
, The Pursuit of Beauty, Yitang Zhang solves a pure-math mystery, The New Yorker, Profiles, February 2, 2015, issue
Discover Magazine article by Steve Nadis, "Prime Solver"
Gaps between Primes – Numberphile – University of Nottingham video (shorter version)
Gaps between Primes (extra footage) – Numberphile (longer version)

1955 births
20th-century American mathematicians
21st-century American mathematicians
American academics of Chinese descent
American accountants
Chinese emigrants to the United States
Institute for Advanced Study visiting scholars
Living people
MacArthur Fellows
Mathematicians from Shanghai
Number theorists
Peking University alumni
Purdue University alumni
University of New Hampshire faculty
University of California, Santa Barbara faculty
20th-century Chinese mathematicians